Sealing may refer to:

Processes
 Seal (emblem), applying a seal to a document for authentication
 Sealing wax, a wax material of a seal which, after melting, hardens quickly
 Duct sealing, the sealing of leaks in air ducts
 Induction sealing, method of heating a metal disk to seal a cap or top on a container
 Porosity sealing, the process of filling a porous substrate to make it airtight
 Record sealing, the practice of making court records confidential
 Sealing compound, sealant, used to block the passage of fluids
 Sealing pavers
 Searing meat (and other foods), commonly but erroneously referred to as 'sealing in the juices' etc.

Religion
 Sealing (Mormonism), a ritual intended to make family relationships permanent even after death
 Sealing power, in Mormonism
 Sealing room

Other
 Sealing the Tomb, altarpiece triptych by William Hogarth in the English city of Bristol
 Seal hunting, personal or commercial hunting of seals

See also
 Seal (disambiguation)
 Seale (disambiguation)
 Sealer (disambiguation)
 Seals (disambiguation)